A cimeter or scimitar is a large, curved butcher's knife, with a blade typically 8-14" (20-35 cm) long. It is used primarily for cutting large pieces of meat into retail cuts such as steaks. These knives are available with and without a granton edge. According to Webstaurant Store, a major supplier to the food industry, "Granton edge knives feature hollowed out sections running along both sides of the blade. When slicing meat, the grooves fill with fat and juices, which permits less contact between the meat and blade. Granton edge knives are often preferred for slicing thin portions of poultry, roasts, or ham."

Etymology
'Cimeter' is a formerly common variant spelling of 'scimitar', a kind of curved sword. The spelling 'cimeter' has become standard for the knife. In The Book of Mormon, the term "cimeter" is used often to describe a weapon of war.

References

 

Knives